Esmaili Kandi (also Romanized as Esmā‘īlī Kandī; also known as Esmā‘īl Kandī) is a village in Pain Barzand Rural District, Anguti District, Germi County, Ardabil Province, Iran. At the 2006 census, its population was 166, in 35 families.

References 

Towns and villages in Germi County